The Grand Avenue–Newtown station is a local station on the IND Queens Boulevard Line of the New York City Subway. Located under private property at the northeast corner of the intersection of Grand Avenue, Broadway, and Queens Boulevard in the neighborhood of Elmhurst, Queens, it is served by the M train on weekdays, the R train at all times except nights, and the E and F trains at night.

The station opened on December 31, 1936 as part of the Independent Subway System's Queens Boulevard Line. The opening of the station brought significant growth to Elmhurst.

History 
The Queens Boulevard Line was one of the first built by the city-owned Independent Subway System (IND), and was planned to stretch between the IND Eighth Avenue Line in Manhattan and 178th Street and Hillside Avenue in Jamaica, Queens, with a stop at Grand Avenue. The line was first proposed in 1925. Construction of the line was approved by the New York City Board of Estimate on October 4, 1928. The line was constructed using the cut-and-cover tunneling method, and to allow pedestrians to cross, temporary bridges were built over the trenches.

The first section of the line opened on August 19, 1933 from the connection to the Eighth Avenue Line at 50th Street to Roosevelt Avenue in Jackson Heights. Later that year, a $23 million loan was approved to finance the remainder of the line, along with other IND lines. The remainder of the line was built by the Public Works Administration. In 1934 and 1935, construction of the extension to Jamaica was suspended for 15 months and was halted by strikes. Construction was further delayed due to a strike in 1935, instigated by electricians opposing wages paid by the General Railway Signal Company.

In August 1936, tracks were installed all the way to 178th Street, and the stations to Union Turnpike were completed.

In Elmhurst, almost all of the century-old buildings in the heart of the village were destroyed for the construction of the subway. Land was taken on the west side of the Broadway to avoid the demolition of St. James Episcopal Church and the Reformed Church of Newtown. An easement was granted so the line could pass under the old St. James Church building at the southwest corner of Broadway and 51st Avenue. Many nineteenth century residences and the Wandowenock Fire Company buildings had to be torn down. To allow the subway line to curve into Queens Boulevard from Broadway, the northeast corner of the two streets was removed, in addition to some stores. New buildings were built behind a new curb line once the subway was completed, bringing a new face to Elmhurst. The introduction of the subway stimulated local growth in Elmhurst. Commercial buildings and apartment houses replaced existing structures.

Station layout 

There are four tracks and two side platforms; the two center express tracks are used by the E and F trains at all times except late nights. In between the local tracks and the express tracks, there are trackway walls. The station has a full length mezzanine, but as the fare control and booth area are at the center of the mezzanine, crossover is available only at the easternmost staircase.

Both platforms have a medium Cerulean blue trim line with a black border and mosaic name tablets reading "GRAND AVE. – NEWTOWN" broken onto two lines in white sans serif lettering on a black background and Cerulean blue border. Small tile captions reading "GRAND" in white lettering on black run below the trim line, and directional signs in the same style are present below some of the name tablets. Concrete-clad columns painted Cadet blue run along both platforms at regular intervals with alternating ones having the standard black name plates in white lettering.

Exits
Each side has two sets of street stairs. There is a full-time entrance at Justice Avenue and Broadway on the west end, with staircases to either side of Broadway. There are also exits to either southern corner of Queens Boulevard at 54th Avenue (the southeast-corner staircase being outside the First Presbyterian Church of Newtown complex), and another staircase to the northern side of Queens Boulevard at 54th Avenue.

High entry/exit turnstiles at both ends of the mezzanine allow people to exit fare control without having to walk down to the middle of the mezzanine. A free crossover between two platforms exists at this location. Originally, there were two fare control areas at each end, which is clear from the presence of two closed staircases at the Manhattan-bound side. The mezzanine narrows to about two-thirds of its width on the southern side of the mezzanine directly to the opposite of the closed staircases. The narrowing of the mezzanine did not allow for staircases on the Queens-bound side in this location like on the Manhattan-bound side. Chain-link fence is used to separate the areas inside and outside fare control. The Manhattan- and Queens-bound paid areas are separated by at this location by the unpaid area, which runs down the center of the mezzanine. In total, this side of the station has four staircases in addition to the two closed ones mentioned, while the other side has five staircases.

References

External links 

 
 The Subway Nut — Grand Avenue–Newtown
 Grand Avenue — Broadway entrance from Google Maps Street View
 54th Avenue entrance from Google Maps Street View
 Platforms from Google Maps Street View
 Mezzanine from Google Maps Street View

IND Queens Boulevard Line stations
New York City Subway stations in Queens, New York
Railway stations in the United States opened in 1936
Elmhurst, Queens
1936 establishments in New York City
Grand Street and Grand Avenue